Kilimanoor Chandran (born 9 February 1950) is an Indian author, poet, and columnist from Kerala, India.

Bibliography
 Daaham (Thirst)- Novel
 haviss – Novel
 Keralathile naadan pattukal (Folk Songs of Kerala)
  Nammude naadan pattukal (Our Folk Songs) – Anthology of Folk songs
 Malayaalam Bhaasa Adhyaapanam
 1995: Rajaravivarmayum chithrakalayum – Biography
 2004: Chorappookkal viriyicha Kallara – Pangode  – Freedom Struggle

Awards
2010 – Abu Dhabi Sakthi Award in other categories of literature by Raja Ravi Varmayude Nizhalil Manjupoya Raja Raja Varma

References

Dept. Of Culture, Kerala
CDS, Thiruvananthapuram

Living people
1950 births
20th-century Indian novelists
21st-century Indian novelists
Indian male short story writers
Indian male novelists
Poets from Kerala
Indian columnists
20th-century Indian biographers
Indian male poets
20th-century Indian short story writers
21st-century Indian short story writers
Novelists from Kerala
20th-century Indian male writers
21st-century Indian male writers
Male biographers
Recipients of the Abu Dhabi Sakthi Award